Marjory Nyaumwe (born 10 July 1987) is a Zimbabwean association football player.

Life
Nyaumwe was born in 1987. Her strong interest in football was blamed by her parents for her poor school exam results. Nyaumwe agreed to give up the game but a better career was not apparent and she rejoined her team after staying at home for 2010. Her parents saw her success when she was part of the team that won the COSAFA Cup. She received $4,000 from President Robert Mugabe and spent some of this extending her parents' house.

She is a member of the Zimbabwe women's national football team and represented the country in their Olympic debut at the 2016 Summer Olympics.

References

1987 births
Living people
Zimbabwean women's footballers
Women's association football midfielders
Zimbabwe women's international footballers
Footballers at the 2016 Summer Olympics
Olympic footballers of Zimbabwe